Salvador Mendoza Jr. (born November 30, 1971) is an American lawyer and jurist serving as U.S. circuit judge of the U.S. Court of Appeals for the Ninth Circuit. He previously served as a U.S. district judge of the U.S. District Court for the Eastern District of Washington from 2014 to 2022 and as a Washington state court judge from 2002 to 2014.

Early life and education
Mendoza was born in 1971 in Pacoima, California, to parents who immigrated to the United States from Mexico. He grew up in the Mid-Columbia region of Washington state and graduated from Prosser High School in 1990. 

Mendoza received a Bachelor of Arts in philosophy in 1994 from the University of Washington. He then attended the UCLA School of Law, graduating in 1997 with a Juris Doctor.

Legal career
While in law school, he spent one summer as a legal intern for the United Farm Workers of America. From 1996 to 1998, he served as a legal intern and later an assistant attorney general in the Washington State Attorney General's Office. From 1998 to 1999, he served as a deputy prosecuting attorney in the Franklin County Prosecutor's Office. From 1999 to 2013, he practiced law, both as a solo practitioner and also with various law partnerships, where he focused on criminal law. Mendoza served as a judge pro tempore in various district, municipal, and juvenile courts in Benton County and Franklin County. Mendoza was a board member of the Benton-Franklin Legal Aid Society. He also helped establish two county-level juvenile drug courts.

Judicial career

State judicial service 
Mendoza ran for a vacant seat on the superior court for Benton and Franklin counties in 2008, but lost the election. In May 2013, however, Mendoza was appointed by Governor Jay Inslee to fill another vacancy on the court. He served on the Superior Court bench in 2013–2014, until his confirmation to the federal bench.

District court service 
On January 16, 2014, President Barack Obama nominated Mendoza to serve as a United States district judge of the United States District Court for the Eastern District of Washington, to the seat vacated by Judge Lonny R. Suko, who assumed senior status on November 1, 2013. Mendoza's name was forwarded to Obama by Senator Patty Murray upon the recommendation of a bipartisan committee of eight that reviewed candidates for the Eastern District of Washington.

Mendoza received a hearing before the United States Senate Committee on the Judiciary on March 12, 2014. On April 3, 2014, his nomination was reported out of committee by a 17–1 vote. On June 12, 2014, Senate Majority Leader Harry Reid filed for a motion to invoke cloture on the nomination. On June 16, 2014, the Senate invoked cloture on his nomination by a 55–37 vote. On June 17, 2014, his nomination was confirmed by a 92–4 vote.  Mendoza received his judicial commission two days later. A formal installation ceremony took place in August 2014. Mendoza was the first Latino judge of the U.S. District Court for the Eastern District of Washington. His service as a district judge was terminated on September 16, 2022, when he was elevated to the United States Court of Appeals for the Ninth Circuit.

Court of appeals service 

On April 13, 2022, President Joe Biden announced his intent to nominate Mendoza to serve as a United States circuit judge of the United States Court of Appeals for the Ninth Circuit. On April 25, 2022, his nomination was sent to the Senate. President Biden nominated Mendoza to the seat to be vacated by Judge M. Margaret McKeown, who will assume senior status upon confirmation of a successor. On May 11, 2022, a hearing on his nomination was held before the Senate Judiciary Committee. On June 9, 2022, his nomination was reported out of committee by an 11–9–2 vote. On September 8, 2022, the United States Senate invoked cloture on his nomination by a 48–43 vote. On September 12, 2022, his nomination was confirmed by a 46–40 vote. He received his judicial commission on September 15, 2022. He is the first Hispanic judge from Washington to serve on the 9th Circuit.

Personal life
Mendoza lives in Kennewick, Washington. He is married to Mia Mendoza, an attorney; they have three children.

See also
List of Hispanic/Latino American jurists
List of first minority male lawyers and judges in Washington

References

External links

Senate Judiciary Committee Questionnaire 

1971 births
Living people
21st-century American judges
American judges of Mexican descent
American lawyers of Mexican descent
Hispanic and Latino American judges
Judges of the United States Court of Appeals for the Ninth Circuit
Judges of the United States District Court for the Eastern District of Washington
Superior court judges in the United States
United States court of appeals judges appointed by Joe Biden
United States district court judges appointed by Barack Obama
UCLA School of Law alumni
University of Washington College of Arts and Sciences alumni
Washington (state) lawyers